Jeff Harnar is an American cabaret singer and recording artist.

Appearances

CARNEGIE HALL:
Carnegie Hall appearances include the Cole Porter Centennial (1991) and Noel Coward Centennial (1998).

Carnegie Weill Recital Hall appearances include “A Talent To Amuse,” a Noel Coward Celebration Hosted by Sheridan Morley (1992); The Mabel Mercer Foundation’s celebrations of Cole Porter (2015) and Jimmy Van Heusen (2017) and a sold-out solo concert in 1993.

Carnegie Zankel Hall appearances include  Michael Feinstein’s celebration of Jule Styne (2012).

TELEVISION:
“The 1959 Broadway Songbook” (PBS);
“Remember: Songs of the Holidays” with KT Sullivan (PBS); as the Singing Narrator of “Gershwin on Ice” starring Dorothy Hamill (A&E); CBS This Morning (Rodgers & Hammerstein Centennial) and “American Songbook Live from NJPAC: Stephen Sondheim” with KT Sullivan (PBS)

SYMPHONY ORCHESTRAS 
“I Got Rhythm: Mickey & Judy’s Hollywood” co-starring Shauna Hicks with The San Diego, Raleigh North Carolina, Spokane, Des Moines, Albany, Middletown Ohio Symphony Orchestras and at New York’s Town Hall with the Barry Levitt Orchestra.

MAJOR CABARET ENGAGEMENTS: 
NEW YORK: The historic Oak Room at The Algonquin Hotel; Feinstein’s/54 Below; Feinstein’s at The Regency, The Ballroom; The Firebird Cafe, The Russian Tea Room, and The Laurie Beechman Theater.
LOS ANGELES: The Cinegrill at The Hollywood Roosevelt 
SAN FRANCISCO: The Plush Room at The York Hotel
CHICAGO: Talouse, Davenport’s, The Mayfair Hotel
FLORIDA: The Colony Hotel in Palm Beach, The Delray Beach Playhouse, Mizner Cultural Park in Boca Raton, The Asolo Repertory Theater in Sarasota

OFF-BROADWAY
“The 1959 Broadway Songbook” 59e59 Theatres

FILM:
The Nightclub Singer in “A Portrait if James Dean” (2012, Iconoclast)

https://www.imdb.com/title/tt1705113/videoplayer/vi294625561
 
PERFORMING ARTS CENTERS:
The Kravis (Palm Beach FL); NJPAC (New Jersey); Westhampton Beach Performing Arts Center (NY), The Bay Street Playhouse (Sag Harbor, NY), The Signature Theater (Arlington VA); The Arts Garage (Delray Beach, FL); The Crest Theater (Delray Beach, FL); BlackRock Center For the Arts (Germantown, MD)

TOURING
As the Singing Narrator of “Gershwin on Ice” starring Dorothy Hamill: The Orpheum Theater in Memphis, The Hilton Atlantic City; and Foxwoods Casino (1998)

OPENING ACT:
For the McGuire Sisters at The Carousel Dinner Theater Akron, OH (1991)
For Julie Wilson (1996),  Vivian Reed (2005) and Barbara Carroll (2008) at Guild Hall in East Hampton, NY

CRUISE LINES: 
Include Regent, Oceania, Cunard, Crystal, Holland America, Celebrity, Norwegian, Royal Caribbean and Royal Viking

Awards

Harnar is the 2012 Winner of The Noël Coward Foundation Cabaret Award.  Harnar is a two-time winner of the Manhattan Association of Cabaret Award (MAC) as Best Male Vocalist and three times been honored with the BackStage Bistro Award (Newcomer, Male Vocalist, Best Show).

Jeff Harnar is a multi-Award-winning performer and Director:

AS A PERFORMER

2022 The Mabel Mercer Award

2022 Chicago Cabaret Professionals National Honoree

THE NOEL COWARD FOUNDATION AWARD (2012)

BROADWAY WORLD CABARET AWARDS

Best Male Vocalist 2014

Best Male Vocalist 2015

Best Male Vocalist 2017

MANHATTAN ASSOCIATION OF CABARET AWARD (MAC AWARD)

Best Male Vocalist 1988

Best Male Vocalist 1990

Outstanding Revue 2016 - “Another Hundred People” with KT Sullivan

Major Male Artist 2018

Major Artist Male 2020

BISTRO AWARD

Best Newcomer 1987

Outstanding Male Vocalist 1988

Outstanding Show 1989 - “Carried Away: Jeff Harnar sings Comden & Green

Outstanding Show 2006 - “A Collective Cy”

Outstanding Revue 2016 - “Another Hundred People” with KT Sullivan

THE DONALD F. SMITH AWARD (2015)

AS A DIRECTOR

BROADWAY WORLD CABARET AWARD

Best Director 2018

MANHATTAN ASSOCIATION OF CABARET AWARD (MAC AWARD)

Best Director 2017

Best Director 2018

BISTRO AWARD

Outstanding Director 2017

Directing 
Jeff Harnar’s work as a Director has garnered him two Broadway World Cabaret Awards, two Manhattan Association of Cabaret (MAC) Awards and a Back Stage Bistro Award and a Broadway World Award for Best Show.

Major Directing projects include:

TOVAH FELDSHUH:

“Tovah is Leona!”

Feinstein’s 54 Below

The Guild Hall (East Hampton NY)

Westhampton Beach Performing Arts Center (NY)

MAC Award Celebrity Artist nomination (Tovah Feldshuh)

MAC Award Best Director

Broadway World Award Best Director

“Aging is Optional”

Feinstein’s 54 Below

Feinstein’s at The Niko (San Francisco)

The Razz Room (Philadelphia PA)

RITA GARDNER:

“Much More: A Tom Jones & Harvey Schmidt Songbook”

The Laurie Beechman Theater

MAC Award Best Director

DAWN DEROW

“My Ship: Songs from 1941”

The Laurie Beechman Theater

The Cape May Playhouse

The Crown & Anchor (Provincetown MA)

MAC Award Female Vocalist Dawn Derow

Bistro Award Best Director

“The House That Built Me”

The Laurie Beechman Theater

JOSEPHINE SANGES

“Come Rain or Come Shine:

"Josephine Sanges sings Harold Arlen”

The Laurie Beechman Theater

Davenport’s (Chicago IL)

MAC Award Female Vocalist (Josephine Sanges)

CELIA BERK:

“You Can’t Rush Spring”

The Metropolitan Room

Broadway World Cabaret Award Best Show

MAC Award New York Debut (Celia Berk)

Margaret Whiting Award (Celia Berk)

“Manhattan Serenade”

The Metropolitan Room

MARGO BROWN

“Margo sings Mercer”

The Metropolitan Room

Don’t Tell Mama

Broadway World Award New York Debut (Margo Brown)

ANNA BERGMAN:

“You’re All The World To Me”

Feinstein’s 54 Below

“You and The Night and The Music”

Feinstein’s at The Regency

JUDI MARK:

“Dancing Through Life”

The Triad

The Laurie Beechman Theater

YALE UNIVERSITY

“Puttin’ on The Ritz” (2019)

An Irving Berlin Gala starring Karen Akers, Klea Blackhurst, Nicolas King, Todd Murray and Anna Bergman

"IT'S DELOVELY" (2014)

A Cole Porter Gala starring Karen Akers, Sally Mayes, Steve Ross, T. Oliver Reid and Anna Bergman

The show had an encore performance at The Westhampton Beach Perfect Arts Center

THE AMERICAN SONGBOOK IN LONDON (2006, 2007, 2008)

Jeff was Artistic Director and Host of three seasons of “The American Songbook in London” at The Jermyn Street Theater and Pizza on The Park.  Under this banner artists such as Julie Wilson, Andrea Marcovicci, Steve Ross, Maureen McGovern, Karen Akers, Liliane Montevecchi, KT Sullivan, Tony DeSare, Maude Maggart and many more appeared.

Discography

Albums

 1959 Broadway Songbook (1991)
 Because of You: Fifties Gold (1995)
 Sammy Cahn: All the Way (2001)
 Dancing In The Dark (2005)
“I Know Things Now: My Life in Sondheim’s Words” (2022)

References

External links
 Jeff Harnar's home page

American jazz singers
American male singers
New Trier High School alumni
American LGBT musicians
Tisch School of the Arts alumni
Living people
1959 births
Musicians from Manhattan Beach, California
Nightclub performers
Singers from California
People from Kenilworth, Illinois
Jazz musicians from Illinois
American male jazz musicians
Jazz musicians from California